Although it is billed as a Duke Ellington and Johnny Hodges album, Side by Side is a 1959 album mostly under the leadership of Johnny Hodges, Duke Ellington's alto saxophonist for many years. Ellington only appears on three of this album's tracks. The album places Hodges at the fore, backing him with piano by Ellington or Billy Strayhorn and providing other accompaniment by jazz figures like Ben Webster, Roy Eldridge, Harry "Sweets" Edison and Jo Jones. The album, a follow-up to Back to Back: Duke Ellington and Johnny Hodges Play the Blues, has remained perpetually in print.

Track listing
"Stompy Jones" (Duke Ellington) – 6:38
"Squeeze Me" (Fats Waller, Clarence Williams) – 4:36
"Big Shoe" (Jimmy Hamilton) – 5:37
"Going Up" (D. Ellington) – 4:51
"Just a Memory" (Ray Henderson, Lew Brown, Buddy DeSylva) – 5:53
"Let's Fall in Love" (Harold Arlen, Ted Koehler) – 6:47
"Ruint" (Mercer Ellington, Johnny Hodges) – 2:32
"Bend One" (Hodges) – 2:59
"You Need to Rock" (Hodges) – 5:52

Personnel

Tracks 1, 2 and 4
Duke Ellington – piano
Johnny Hodges – alto saxophone
Harry "Sweets" Edison – trumpet
Les Spann – flute (track 4 only), guitar
Al Hall – bass
Jo Jones – drums

These tracks were recorded February 26, 1959

Tracks 3 and 5 through 9
Johnny Hodges – alto saxophone
Roy Eldridge – trumpet
Lawrence Brown – trombone
Ben Webster – tenor saxophone
Billy Strayhorn – piano
Wendell Marshall – bass
Jo Jones – drums

These tracks were recorded August 14, 1958

Nat Hentoff – liner notes

Notes

1959 albums
Duke Ellington albums
Johnny Hodges albums
Verve Records albums
Albums produced by Norman Granz
Collaborative albums